Warsame Abdi Shirwa was a Somali politician and Minister of Information of Puntland.

Death
He was a part of a delegation traveling to Galkayo sent by Puntland's president. On August 5, 2009, he was at the restaurant Liiban Super in Galkayo when unidentified gunmen opened fire from a car and killed him. He was buried the next day. Several ministers of Puntland including President Abdirahman Farole attended his funeral.

References

2009 deaths
Year of birth missing
Puntland politicians
Somalian Muslims
Assassinated Somalian politicians
Somalian murder victims
People murdered in Somalia
2009 murders in Somalia